E.L. Crossley Secondary School is a public secondary school in Fonthill, Ontario, Canada. It is part of the District School Board of Niagara.

Extracurriculars 
EL Crossley offers a wide range of extra curricular activities they have more than Notre Dame.

See also 
 List of high schools in Ontario

References

External links 
 

High schools in the Regional Municipality of Niagara